The St. Lachtain's Church was built in 1731 in the centre of the village of Freshford, County Kilkenny in Ireland on the R693 regional road. It incorporates a portal from 1100 as its main entrance.

St. Lachtain died in Donoughmore, County Cork in 622 AD. It is almost certain that a church was built on the present site after 622 AD. The Danes (also known as Vikings or Norsemen) robbed it of its gold and silver ornaments and burnt all its books.

The church was replaced in 1100; however all that is left of the 1100 church is the beautiful Hiberno-Romanesque (Irish-Roman) architectural porch and doorway. The remainder of the present church was built for Protestant worship in 1731.  The arch bears a prayer in old Irish writing:

A prayer for Niamh, daughter of Corc, and for Mathgamhan O Chearmaic for whom this church was made. A prayer for Gille Mocholmoc O Chearmaic for whom this church was made. A prayer for Gille Mocholmoc O Ceannucain who made it.

In St. Lachtain's time Freshford was a diocese. In 1225 a Bishop's palace was built at Aghore (Achadh Ur), now Uppercourt. It was used as a summer residence for over 300 years.

National Monument

The sandstone Romanesque portal is deemed a National Monument.

Churches in County Kilkenny
National Monuments in County Kilkenny
Church of Ireland church buildings in the Republic of Ireland
Romanesque architecture in Ireland